Bjerringbro FH  is a handball club from Bjerringbro, Denmark. Currently, Bjerringbro FH competes in the women's Danish 1st Division. The home arena of the club is Bjerringbro Idræts & Kulturcenter.

Team

Current squad 
Squad for the 2022–23 season 

Goalkeepers
 12  Sarah Ernebjerg Jensen
 20  Clara Bak 
Wingers
LW
 4  Emilie Bangshøi
 35  Katja Ryesberg
RW
 44  Louise Hald
Line players
 5  Sofie Lund
 18  Sidsel Poulsen

Back players
LB
 11  Arlinda Hajdari
 14  Caroline Højer
CB
 7  Line Gyldenløve Kristensen
 72  Line Frandsen
RB
 19  Louise Søndergaard

Transfers
Transfers for the 2023-24 season

Joining

Leaving
  Louise Søndergaard (RB) (to  Viborg HK)

Former players 
  Stine Broløs

Men's team

External links

 Official website

Danish handball clubs